Dhani pujariyon ki is a small town located at 27.649 North latitude, 75.670 East longitude (27°38'56.4"N 75°40'12.0"E) and the Elevation is 1460 feet.

Postal Address - Post Chala, Tehsil Neemkathana, District Sikar, Rajasthan (India) PIN - 332706.

The population of the town is about 160.

Residence 
Khichars are residing there. Khichar is a gotra of the caste Jat.

References 
 Google Maps

External links 

 Position on Google Maps
 Direction from New Delhi, India to Dhani Pujariyon Ki, Rajasthan
 Direction from Jaipur, Rajasthan to Dhani Pujariyon Ki, Rajasthan
 Direction from Sikar, Rajasthan to Dhani Pujariyon Ki, Rajasthan

Villages in Sikar district